Dabby-Doughs are a type of pastry. They are traditionally made using the remnants of dough leftovers from making a pie, although they can be prepared in large amounts by simply making a batch of pastry dough. The filling of a dabby-dough is typically a mixture of cinnamon and white sugar sprinkled on butter or margarine, rolled, sliced and baked.

There are many different names for this type of confection, including "cinnamon snails", "schnecken", "bumble bees", "pinwheels", "tuzzie-muzzies", "gobblies", "schmekels," "doo-dads" and "mock rugula".

References

Pastries